Monoblepharis is a genus of fungi belonging to the family Monoblepharidaceae.

The genus has almost cosmopolitan distribution.

Species
Species:
 Monoblepharis bullata 
 Monoblepharis fasciculata 
 Monoblepharis hypogyna 
 Monoblepharis insignis 
 Monoblepharis laevis 
 Monoblepharis macranda
 Monoblepharis macrandra 
 Monoblepharis micrandra 
 Monoblepharis ovigera 
 Monoblepharis polymorpha 
 Monoblepharis regignens 
 Monoblepharis sphaerica 
 Monoblepharis thalassinosa

References

Fungi